Stanbury is a village in the Haworth, Cross Roads and Stanbury civil parish, and in the metropolitan borough of the City of Bradford in West Yorkshire, England.
The name Stanbury translates as Stone Fort from Old English.

Geography 

Less than half a mile north-east is the hamlet of Lumbfoot.
Stanbury is Historically part of the West Riding of Yorkshire. The River Worth is immediately north of the village and Sladen Beck is just to the south.
Two paths pass through the village; The Brontë Way and The Pennine way.

Landmarks 

The surrounding countryside is mainly moors and farmland. Ponden Reservoir was built in the 1870s and a reservoir was approved to be built at Lower Laithe on Sladen Beck in 1869, but it was not started until 1911.
Due to the nation being involved in the First World War, the reservoir was not completed until 1925.
Its completion necessitated the abandonment of the hamlet of Smith Bank.
The village is close to the Brontë Waterfall and Top Withens tourist landmarks.
Emily Brontë is reputed to have used Top Withens as the model for the location of Wuthering Heights, and nearby Ponden Hall (half a mile from the edge of Stanbury) has been considered the model for 'Thrushcross Grange' in the same book.
It has also been theorized that Ponden Hall is actually the setting for Top Withens as its size is smaller than that of Thrushcross Grange as described in the book.
There are also additional theories that the hall is the model for Wildfell Hall in Anne Brontë's The Tenant of Wildfell Hall.
There is an Anglican church in Stanbury built in 1848. In 1998, it was named St Gabriels, after spending the previous 150 years without a name. The school caters for primary school age children.
There are two public houses: The Friendly and the Wuthering Heights which dates from 1763 and was formerly and locally known as 'The Cross'.
The Old Silent Inn (formerly The Eagle) is a public house and guest house close to the village which is over 400 years old.

Gallery

See also
 Listed buildings in Haworth, Cross Roads and Stanbury
 Brontë Country
 Brontë waterfall

References

External links

Haworth, Cross Roads and Stanbury Parish Council

Geography of the City of Bradford
Villages in West Yorkshire